W240CP is a low-powered translator-style radio station licensed to and serving Bowling Green, Kentucky. It is a Contemporary hit radio station that simulcasts a second HD Radio subchannel of parent station WOVO, which is licensed to Horse Cave, but also serves Bowling Green and Glasgow. Known on air as "96 Hits", it broadcasts with a frequency of 95.9 megahertz. The translator's transmitter is located near Rockfield.

This station is also broadcast over Glasgow-licensed translator W239BT at 95.7 megahertz. As a Top 40 station, the translator's main rivals are WUHU in Bowling Green, and Nashville's WRVW.

On March 21, 2018, W240CP rebranded as "95.9 The Vibe".

Signal coverage 
The translator station can be received on a regular radio tuner in all parts of Warren and Simpson Counties, along with much of neighboring Allen, Butler, Edmonson, and Logan Counties. The small community of Mitchellville, Tennessee can also receive at least Grade C coverage. An HD radio set is necessary to receive the HD2 subchannel anywhere within WOVO's signal coverage area. W239BT expands the analog radio coverage into Barren, Hart, Metcalfe, and Monroe Counties in southern Kentucky.

References

External links

240CP
Contemporary hit radio stations in the United States
Radio stations established in 2015
2015 establishments in Kentucky